Pure gold is slightly reddish yellow in color, but colored gold in various other colors can be produced by alloying gold with other elements.

Colored golds can be classified in three groups:
 Alloys with silver and copper in various proportions, producing white, yellow, green and red golds. These are typically malleable alloys.
 Intermetallic compounds, producing blue and purple golds, as well as other colors. These are typically brittle, but can be used as gems and inlays.
 Surface treatments, such as oxide layers.

Pure 100% (in practice, 99.9% or better) gold is 24 karat by definition, so all colored golds are less pure than this, commonly 18K (75%), 14K (58.5%), 10K (41.6%), or 9K (37.5%).

Alloys

White gold

White gold is an alloy of gold and at least one white metal (usually nickel, silver, or palladium). Like yellow gold, the purity of white gold is given in karats.

White gold's properties vary depending on the metals used and their proportions. As a result, white gold alloys can be used for many different purposes: while a nickel alloy is hard and strong, and therefore good for rings and pins; gold–palladium alloys are soft, pliable, and good for white-gold gemstone settings, sometimes with other metals, like copper, silver, and platinum, added for weight and durability (although this often requires specialized goldsmiths). The term white gold is used very loosely in the industry to describe karat gold alloys with a whitish hue. The word white covers a broad range of colors that borders or overlaps pale yellow, tinted brown, and even very pale rose. The jewelry industry often conceals these off-white colors by rhodium plating; thus it is a common misconception that the color of the rhodium plating, which is seen on many commercial pieces, is the actual color of white gold.

A common white gold formulation consists of 90% wt. gold and 10% wt. nickel. Copper can be added to increase malleability.

The strength of gold–nickel–copper alloys is caused by formation of two phases: a gold-rich Au–Cu, and a nickel-rich Ni–Cu, and the resulting hardening of the material.

The alloys used in the jewelry industry are gold–palladium–silver and gold–nickel–copper–zinc. Palladium and nickel act as primary bleaching agents for gold; zinc acts as a secondary bleaching agent to attenuate the color of copper.

The nickel used in some white gold alloys can cause an allergic reaction when worn over long periods (also notably on some wristwatch casings). This reaction, typically a minor skin rash from nickel dermatitis, occurs in about one out of eight people; because of this, many countries do not use nickel in their white gold formulations.

Gold is rarely pure gold, even before another metal is added to make a white gold alloy, and often contains a mercury alloy from its production; mercury can also cause an allergic reaction.

Yellow gold
Examples of the common alloys for 18K yellow gold include:

 18K yellow gold: 75% gold, 12.5% copper, 12.5% silver
 18K yellow (darker) gold: 75% gold, 15% copper, 10% silver

Rose, red, and pink gold

Rose gold is a gold–copper alloy widely used for specialized jewelry. Rose gold, also known as pink gold and red gold, was popular in Russia at the beginning of the 19th century, and was also known as Russian gold, although this term is now obsolete. Rose gold jewelry is becoming more popular in the 21st century, and is commonly used for wedding rings, bracelets, and other jewelry.

Although the names are often used interchangeably, the difference between red, rose, and pink gold is the copper content: the higher the copper content, the stronger the red coloration. Pink gold uses the least copper, followed by rose gold, with red gold having the highest copper content. Examples of the common alloys for 18K rose gold, 18K red gold, 18K pink gold, and 12K red gold include:

 18K red gold: 75% gold, 25% copper
 18K rose gold: 75% gold, 22.25% copper, 2.75% silver
 18K pink gold: 75% gold, 20% copper, 5% silver
 12K red gold: 50% gold and 50% copper

Up to 15% zinc can be added to copper-rich alloys to change their color to reddish yellow or dark yellow. 14K red gold, often found in the Middle East, contains 41.67% copper.

The highest karat version of rose gold, also known as crown gold, is 22 karat.

During ancient times, due to impurities in the smelting process, gold frequently turned a reddish color. This is why many Greco-Roman texts, and even many texts from the Middle Ages, describe gold as "red".

Spangold

Some gold-copper–aluminium alloys form a fine surface texture at heat treatment, yielding an interesting spangling effect. At cooling, they undergo a quasi-martensitic transformation from body-centered cubic to body-centered tetragonal phase; the transformation does not depend on the cooling rate. A polished object is heated in hot oil to 150–200 °C for 10 minutes then cooled below 20 °C, forming a sparkly surface covered with tiny facets.

The alloy of 76% gold, 19% copper, and 5% aluminium yields a yellow color; the alloy of 76% gold, 18% copper and 6% aluminium is pink.

Green gold

Green gold was known to the ancient Persians as long ago as 860 BC under the name electrum, a naturally occurring alloy of silver and gold. It actually appears as greenish-yellow rather than green. Fired enamels adhere better to these alloys than to pure gold.

Cadmium can also be added to gold alloys to create a green color, but there are health concerns regarding its use, as cadmium is highly toxic. The alloy of 75% gold, 15% silver, 6% copper, and 4% cadmium yields a dark-green alloy.

Grey gold
Grey gold alloys are usually made from gold and palladium. A cheaper alternative which does not use palladium is made by adding silver, manganese, and copper to the gold in specific ratios.

Intermetallic

All the AuX2 intermetallics have the fluorite (CaF2) crystal structure, and, therefore, are brittle. Deviation from the stoichiometry results in loss of color. Slightly nonstoichiometric compositions are used, however, to achieve a fine-grained two- or three-phase microstructure with reduced brittleness. Another way of reducing brittleness is to add a small amount of palladium, copper, or silver.

The intermetallic compounds tend to have poor corrosion resistance. The less noble elements are leached to the environment, and a gold-rich surface layer is formed. Direct contact of blue and purple gold elements with skin should be avoided as exposure to sweat may result in metal leaching and discoloration of the metal surface.

Purple gold

Purple gold (also called amethyst gold and violet gold) is an alloy of gold and aluminium rich in gold–aluminium intermetallic (AuAl2). Gold content in AuAl2 is around 79% and can therefore be referred to as 18 karat gold. Purple gold is more brittle than other gold alloys (called the "purple plague" when it forms and causes serious faults in electronics), as it is an intermetallic compound instead of a malleable alloy, and a sharp blow may cause it to shatter. It is therefore usually machined and faceted to be used as a "gem" in conventional jewelry rather than by itself. At a lower content of gold, the material is composed of the intermetallic and an aluminium-rich solid solution phase. At a higher content of gold, the gold-richer intermetallic AuAl forms; the purple color is preserved to about 15% of aluminium. At 88% of gold the material is composed of AuAl and changes color. The actual composition of AuAl2 is closer to Al11Au6 as the sublattice is incompletely occupied.

Blue gold
Blue gold is an alloy of gold and either gallium or indium. Gold–indium contains 46% gold (about 11 karat) and 54% indium, forming an intermetallic compound AuIn2. While several sources remark this intermetallic to have "a clear blue color", in fact the effect is slight: AuIn2 has CIE LAB color coordinates of 79, −3.7, −4.2 which appears roughly as a greyish color. With gallium, gold forms an intermetallic AuGa2 (58.5% Au, 14ct) which has slighter bluish hue. The melting point of AuIn2 is 541 °C, for AuGa2 it is 492 °C. AuIn2 is less brittle than AuGa2, which itself is less brittle than AuAl2.

A surface plating of blue gold on karat gold or sterling silver can be achieved by a gold plating of the surface, followed by indium plating, with layer thickness matching the 1:2 atomic ratio. A heat treatment then causes interdiffusion of the metals and formation of the required intermetallic compound.

Surface treatments

Black gold

Black gold is a type of gold used in jewelry. Black-colored gold can be produced by various methods:
Patination by applying sulfur- and oxygen-containing compounds.
Plasma-assisted chemical vapor deposition process involving amorphous carbon
Controlled oxidation of gold containing chromium or cobalt (e.g. 75% gold, 25% cobalt).

A range of colors from brown to black can be achieved on copper-rich alloys by treatment with potassium sulfide.

Cobalt-containing alloys, e.g. 75% gold with 25% cobalt, form a black oxide layer with heat treatment at 700–950 °C. Copper, iron and titanium can be also used for such effect. Gold–cobalt–chromium alloy (75% gold, 15% cobalt, 10% chromium) yields a surface oxide that is olive-tinted because of the chromium(III) oxide content, is about five times thinner than Au–Co and has significantly better wear resistance. The gold–cobalt alloy consists of gold-rich (about 94% Au) and cobalt-rich (about 90% Co) phases; the cobalt-rich phase grains are capable of oxide-layer formation on their surface.

More recently, black gold can be formed by creating nanostructures on the surface. A femtosecond laser pulse deforms the surface of the metal, creating an immensely increased surface area which absorbs virtually all the light that falls on it, thus rendering it deep black, but this method is used in high technology applications rather than for appearance in jewelry. The blackness is due to the excitation of localized surface plasmons which creates strong absorption in a broad range in plasmon resonance. The broadness of the plasmon resonance, and absorption wavelength range, depends on the interaction between different gold nanoparticles.

Blue gold
Oxide layers can also be used to obtain blue gold from an alloy of 75% gold, 24.4% iron, and 0.6% nickel; the layer forms on heat treatment in air between 450–600 °C.

A rich sapphire blue colored gold of 20–23K can also be obtained by alloying with ruthenium, rhodium and three other elements and heat-treating at 1800 °C, to form the 3–6 micrometers thick colored surface oxide layer.

See also
 Corinthian bronze
 Crown gold
 Electrum
 Hepatizon
 List of alloys
 Mokume-gane, a mixed-metal laminate
 Orichalcum
 Panchaloha, alloys used for making Hindu temple icons 
Pyrite, often referred to as Fool's Gold 
 Shakudō, copper with 4–10% gold
 Tumbaga

References

External links

Gold
Precious metal alloys